{{speciesbox
|name = Granite rock box
|image = Eucalyptus petraea.jpg
|image_caption = "Eucalyptus petraea flowers
|genus = Eucalyptus
|species = petraea
|status_system = 
|status = 
|authority = D.J.Carr & S.G.M.Carr
}}Eucalyptus petraea, commonly known as granite rock box, is a species of mallee or a small tree that is endemic to Western Australia. It has thin, ribbony or flaky to fibrous bark on the lower trunk, smooth greyish above, lance-shaped adult leaves, flower buds usually in groups of seven, creamy white flowers and conical fruit.

It has thin, ribbony to flaky or fibrous bark on the lowest  of the trunk, smooth greyish bark above. Flowering occurs from January to February and from August to September and the flowers are creamy white.

Taxonomy and namingEucalyptus petraea was first formally described in 1983 by Denis and Stella Carr in the journal Nuytsia from material they collected near Gnarlbine Rock in 1980. The specific epithet (petraea) is from the Latin word petraueus'' meaning "growing among rocks".

Distribution and habitat
Granite rock box grows in isolated locations near granite boulders between Coorow, Merredin and Karonie, east of Kalgoorlie.

See also
List of Eucalyptus species

References

Eucalypts of Western Australia
Trees of Australia
petraea
Myrtales of Australia
Plants described in 1983
Taxa named by Maisie Carr